Kato Ajanare ("All the unknown") is a Bengali novel written by Mani Shankar Mukherjee. This was Shankar's first novel which mainly deals with author's memories of Mr. Barwell, a renowned Barrister of the Calcutta High Court.

Adaptation
In 1959 Ritwik Ghatak started creating a Bengali film Kato Ajanare based on this novel, but the film remained unfinished.

References

20th-century Indian novels
Indian Bengali-language novels